Sir Richard Lodge (20 June 1855 – 2 June 1936) was a British historian.

He was born at Penkhull, Staffordshire, the fourth of eight sons and a daughter of Oliver Lodge (1826–1884) – later a china clay merchant at Wolstanton, Staffordshire – and his wife, Grace (née Heath) (1826–1879). His siblings included Sir Oliver Lodge (1851–1940), physicist; Eleanor Constance Lodge (1869–1936), historian and Principal of Westfield College, London; and Alfred Lodge (1854–1937), mathematician.

Lodge matriculated at Balliol College, Oxford in 1874, graduating B.A. in 1877, and becoming a Fellow of Brasenose College in 1878. He was Professor of History at the University of Glasgow 1894–1899 and then Professor of History at the University of Edinburgh from 1899 to 1925. During his time at Edinburgh he was appointed Dean of the Faculty of Arts at the university, and was a founder of the Edinburgh University Settlement charity which established houses for students and fellows to live amongst the poor of the city. He was a fellow of the Royal Historical Society, and in due course became its president (1929–1933). He was knighted in 1917.

Lodge died on 2 June 1936 aged 80; he was buried at Holywell Cemetery, Oxford.

Publications
Lodge’s many publications included a biography of Richelieu in 1896.

References

External links 
Photographic portrait of Sir Richard Lodge at the National Portrait Gallery, London

1855 births
1936 deaths
People from Penkhull
Knights Bachelor
Academics of the University of Edinburgh
Academics of the University of Glasgow
Fellows of the Royal Historical Society
Presidents of the Royal Historical Society